Peter John Chorley Reade (born 14 January 1939) is a British former sailor who competed in the 1964 Summer Olympics.

References

1939 births
Living people
British male sailors (sport)
Olympic sailors of Great Britain
Sailors at the 1964 Summer Olympics – Dragon